Sophie Lara Winkleman (born 5 August 1980) is an English actress. She is married to Lord Frederick Windsor, the son of Prince Michael of Kent, a paternal cousin of Queen Elizabeth II.

Early life
Winkleman was born in Primrose Hill, London. Her father, Barry Winkleman, published the Times Atlas of World History,  and her mother is the children's author Cindy Black. The television presenter Claudia Winkleman is her half-sister from her father's first marriage to Eve Pollard. 
Sophie Winkleman was educated at the City of London School for Girls and at Trinity Hall, Cambridge, where she studied English literature. She joined the Cambridge Footlights and wrote and performed in the comic revue Far Too Happy, which toured Britain for three months and gained the troupe's first Perrier Award nomination in 20 years. She joined the National Youth Theatre of Great Britain in 1997.  She is also a soprano, reprising her singing in the First Love series for Sky Arts.

Career

Television
Winkleman's credits include recurring roles in series including Big Suze in Peep Show, numerous roles in Harry & Paul, Joely in White Teeth, Fiona in The Trial of Tony Blair, Abby in Plus One, Katerina in Red Dwarf: Back to Earth, Donna in Lead Balloon, Prudence in Keen Eddie, Elle Kensington in Chasing Alice, Regan Peverill in the pilot episode of Lewis, Angela Warren in Agatha Christie's Poirot (in the episode "Five Little Pigs"), Princess Eleanor in The Palace, Ghislaine in Robin Hood, Alice Shadwell in Dalziel and Pascoe, Ann Hamilton in Death in Paradise, Jill in TV Land's Hot in Cleveland, Sharon Kirby in CSI Miami and Dorothy Gibson in Titanic.

Winkleman was nominated for Best Newcomer by the BBC for her performance as Clara Gold in Waking the Dead. Winkleman made her debut on American television as the star of the NBC sitcom 100 Questions as main character Charlotte Payne and also appeared as a recurring guest on the hit series Two and a Half Men as Zoey, the British girlfriend of Walden Schmidt (Ashton Kutcher).

Stage
Winkleman's roles while at Cambridge University included the Bride in García Lorca's Blood Wedding, which toured the amphitheatres of Greece, Elizabeth in Six Degrees of Separation, which played at the Edinburgh Festival, Abigail in Arthur Miller's The Crucible, Dockdaisy in Bertolt Brecht's The Resistible Rise of Arturo Ui, Kate in Alan Ayckbourn's Confusions, Madame de Merteuil in Christopher Hampton's Les Liaisons Dangereuses and Fraulein Kost in Kander and Ebb's Cabaret all at the ADC. Winkleman's stage career after Cambridge includes a season at the Royal Shakespeare Company, where she played Veronique in Laurence Boswell's adaptation of Beauty and the Beast and a summer in Bath with the Peter Hall Company playing a variety of roles including Archangela in Galileo's Daughter directed by Peter Hall, a new play by Timberlake Wertenbaker, Violet in George Bernard Shaw's Man and Superman directed by Peter Hall, and Charlotte in Molière's Don Juan, directed by Thea Sharrock. In 2012 she played Helena in Eric Idle's musical What About Dick at the Orpheum Theatre in downtown Los Angeles, alongside Eddie Izzard, Russell Brand and Billy Connolly.

Film
Winkleman's film credits include the lead roles in the films Shattered and Love Live Long, written and directed by Mike Figgis. Winkleman also played the comic role of Debbie Levine in Pathe's romantic comedy Suzie Gold and the older Susan Pevensie in the Disney film The Chronicles of Narnia: The Lion, the Witch and the Wardrobe. Other film roles include the leads in the shorts Seared, Love Letters, and The Lost Domain, a cinematic take on Alain-Fournier's Le Grand Meaulnes, and Post, directed by Debs Gardner-Paterson.

Radio
Winkleman is a regular in BBC Radio 4 comedy and drama. She is among the cast of comedy programmes such as Marcus Brigstocke's Giles Wemmbley-Hogg Goes Off, and such afternoon plays as Tea for Two. She played Polly Pot in P.G. Wodehouse's Uncle Fred in the Springtime with Alfred Molina and Rufus Sewell, Gloria in Bernard Shaw's You Never Can Tell, and Zoe in Alan Ayckbourn's Henceforward, alongside Jared Harris, all for Radio 4. She also played the role of Sasha in Von Ribbentrop's Watch, a historical drama, Anna Freud in the play Dr. Freud Will See You Now, Mrs. Hitler, by Laurence Marks and Maurice Gran, and the Amazon warrior princess Penthesilea alongside Alistair McGowan and Stephen Mangan in the Radio 4 comic fantasy series ElvenQuest, by Anil Gupta and Richard Pinto. She has also starred in several Doctor Who plays for Radio 4.

Personal life
Winkleman married Lord Frederick Windsor, the son of Prince and Princess Michael of Kent, in Hampton Court Palace on 12 September 2009. By virtue of her marriage, she became entitled to be styled as Lady Frederick Windsor, but continues to use her own name in her professional career. On 15 August 2013, the couple had a daughter, Maud Elizabeth Daphne Marina, who was born at the Ronald Reagan UCLA Medical Center in Los Angeles, and is the first grandchild of Prince and Princess Michael of Kent. Their second child, daughter Isabella Alexandra May, was born on 16 January 2016 at Chelsea and Westminster Hospital.

On 3 December 2017, it was reported that Winkleman had been seriously injured in a head-on car crash, suffering a broken back and foot. She was a back-seat passenger in a chauffeur-driven car when another vehicle struck her car after swerving to avoid a deer. It was reported that she would not suffer long-term problems, but faced weeks of recuperation.

In June 2020, it was announced that she was the new royal patron of the Children's Surgery Foundation. The following month, it was announced that she would be the first female and newest patron of School-Home Support, and in June 2022 she presented the BBC Radio 4 Appeal on its behalf.

Filmography
 2001: Me Without You
 2002: Ultimate Force as Woman in Bank
 2002: White Teeth as Joely
 2002: Waking the Dead as Joanna Gold/Clara Gold (2 episodes)
 2003: Chasing Alice
 2003: Keen Eddie as Prudence 
 2003: Agatha Christie's Poirot as Angela Warren 
 2004: Suzie Gold as Debbie Levine
 2004: AD/BC: A Rock Opera as Wise Man
 2005: The Chronicles of Narnia: The Lion, the Witch and the Wardrobe as Older Susan
 2005–2010: Peep Show as Big Suze (10 episodes)
 2006: Lewis as Regan Peverill
 2006: Dalziel and Pascoe as Alice Shadwell (episode "A Death in the Family")
 2007: The Trial of Tony Blair as Fiona
 2007: Shattered as Natalie Encore
 2007–2012: Harry and Paul as various roles/characters 
 2008: The Palace as Princess Eleanor (8 episodes)
 2008: Love Live Long as Rachel
 2008: Seared as Stranger
 2009: Plus One as Abby Ross 
 2009: Kingdom as Kate 
 2009: Red Dwarf: Back to Earth as Katerina (2 episodes)
 2009: Red Dwarf: The Making of Back to Earth as herself
 2009: Robin Hood as Ghislaine 
 2010: 100 Questions as Charlotte Payne (6 episodes)
 2011: Lead Balloon
 2011: CSI: Miami as Sharon Kirby 
 2011: Death in Paradise as Mrs Hamilton 
 2012: Titanic as Dorothy Gibson
 2015: Hot in Cleveland as Jill Scroggs (1 episode)
 2011–2015: Two and a Half Men as Zoey (Seasons 9–12)
 2016: Milo Murphy's Law as Time Ape
 2018: Trust as Margot
 2019: Endeavour as Isobel Humbolt
 2019: Sanditon as Lady Susan Worcester
 2020: Strike: Lethal White as Kinvara Chiswell
 2022: This is Going to Hurt as Kathleen

Bibliography

References

External links

 

1980 births
Living people
21st-century English actresses
Actresses from London
Alumni of Trinity Hall, Cambridge
English film actresses
English people of Jewish descent
English sopranos
English stage actresses
English television actresses
Sophie
National Youth Theatre members
People educated at the City of London School for Girls
Royal Shakespeare Company members